Jérémy Huysman (born 8 November 1988) is a French professional footballer who plays as a defensive midfielder.

Professional career
Huysman has spent all but one season of his entire career at Dunkerque, and was their talismanic players as they achieved promotions into the Ligue 2. Huysman made his professional debut with Dunkerque in a 1-0 Ligue 2 win over Valenciennes FC on 19 September 2020.

Personal life
Huysman is the son of the French football manager and former player Nicolas Huysman.

References

External links
 
 FDB Profile

1988 births
Living people
Sportspeople from Dunkirk
French footballers
USL Dunkerque players
Ligue 2 players
Championnat National players
Championnat National 2 players
Association football midfielders
Footballers from Hauts-de-France